Gustavinho is a nick name, a diminutive for Gustavo. It may refer to:

 Gustavinho (basketball) (born 1980), Gustavo de Conti, Brazilian basketball coach and former player
 Gustavinho (footballer, born 1982), Gustavo Nacarato Veronesi, Brazilian football midfielder
 Gustavinho (footballer, born 2001), Gustavo César Mendonça Gravino, Brazilian football midfielder
 Gustavinho (footballer, born 2004), Gustavo Ribeiro Neves, Brazilian football forward
 Gustavinho em o Enigma da Esfinge, 1996 Brazilian educational film